Nathu Singh may refer to:

 Nathu Singh (cricketer) (born 1995), Indian cricketer
 Nathu Singh Gurjar (born 1951), Indian politician
 Nathu Singh Rathore (1900–?), Indian Army officer